The 1984 Swedish Open was a men's tennis tournament played on outdoor clay courts held in Båstad, Sweden and was part of the Grand Prix circuit of the 1984 Tour. It was the 37th edition of the tournament and was held from 16 July through 22 July 1984. Second-seeded Henrik Sundström won the singles title.

Finals

Singles

 Henrik Sundström defeated  Anders Järryd 3–6, 7–5, 6–3
 It was Sundström's 3rd singles title of the year and the 4th of his career.

Doubles

 Jan Gunnarsson /  Michael Mortensen defeated  Juan Avendaño /  Fernando Roese 6–0, 6–0

References

External links
 ITF tournament edition details

Swedish Open
Swedish Open
Swedish Open
Swedish Open